100% No Modern Talking is the debut EP by Australian electro house duo Knife Party. It was released 12 December 2011 as a free download on their website, Facebook, and SoundCloud, as well as being available for purchase on Beatport and iTunes. The EP originally was to feature "Back to the Z-List", but was replaced with "Destroy Them with Lazers" as Knife Party no longer liked their first choice. The album title refers to the "Modern Talking" wavetable in the software synthesizer Massive by Native Instruments, which creates the "talking" sound featured in popular dubstep tracks. Rob Swire has described it as "the Comic Sans of dubstep sounds".

Track listing

Charts

References

2011 debut EPs
Knife Party EPs